Languyan, officially the Municipality of Languyan,  is a 1st class municipality in the province of Tawi-Tawi, Philippines. According to the 2020 census, it has a population of 37,096 people.

Geography

Barangays
Languyan is politically subdivided into 20 barangays.

Climate

Demographics

Economy

References

External links
Languyan Profile at PhilAtlas.com
[ Philippine Standard Geographic Code]
Languyan Profile at the DTI Cities and Municipalities Competitive Index
Philippine Census Information

Municipalities of Tawi-Tawi